"The Pass" is the second single from Rush's 1989 album Presto. The lyrics by drummer Neil Peart address teenage suicide and the tendency to romanticize it. The song peaked at  15 on the U.S. Hot Mainstream Rock Tracks chart, and a music video was made for the song.

The lines "All of us get lost in the darkness/Dreamers learn to steer by the stars/All of us do time in the gutter/Dreamers turn to look at the cars" alludes to Oscar Wilde's "We are all in the gutter, but some of us are looking at the stars" from his play Lady Windermere's Fan.

On the Rush in Rio DVD (2003), bassist/vocalist Geddy Lee introduces the song to the audience by saying it is one of the band's favourites. On the same DVD, in the documentary "The Boys in Brazil", Peart says he always gets emotional while playing the song, "not only for what it expresses explicitly lyrically, but because it is one of our better crafted ones."

Track listing

References

1989 songs
1990 singles
Rush (band) songs
Atlantic Records singles
Song recordings produced by Rupert Hine
Songs about suicide
Songs written by Neil Peart
Songs written by Alex Lifeson
Songs written by Geddy Lee